Dillon Peak is a peak in the Dana Mountains surmounting the north side of the terminus of Haines Glacier, in Palmer Land. It was mapped by the United States Geological Survey from ground surveys and U.S. Navy air photos, 1961–67, and was named by the Advisory Committee on Antarctic Names for Raymond D. Dillon, a biologist at McMurdo Station and Palmer Station during the 1966–67 and 1967–68 seasons.

References 

Mountains of Palmer Land